A total solar eclipse will occur on August 24, 2063. A solar eclipse occurs when the Moon passes between Earth and the Sun, thereby totally or partly obscuring the image of the Sun for a viewer on Earth. A total solar eclipse occurs when the Moon's apparent diameter is larger than the Sun's, blocking all direct sunlight, turning day into darkness. Totality occurs in a narrow path across Earth's surface, with the partial solar eclipse visible over a surrounding region thousands of kilometres wide.

Related eclipses

Solar eclipses 2062–2065

Saros 136

Metonic cycle

References

External links 
 http://eclipse.gsfc.nasa.gov/SEplot/SEplot2051/SE2063Aug24T.GIF

2063 08 24
2063 in science
2063 08 24
2063 08 24